The Vietnam V.League 1 clubs in the AFC Cup. This details the participation and performances in the competition since its rebranding and reformatting in 2004 and excludes the details of the old AFC Club Championship.

Participations
 Until 2016: GS : Group Stage, R16 : Round of 16, QF : Quarterfinals, SF : Semifinals, RU : Runners-Up, W : Winners
From 2017: GS : Group Stage, ZSF : Zonal semi-finals, ZF : Zonal finals, IZSF : Inter-zone play-off semi-finals. IZF : Inter-zone play-off finals, RU : Runners-Up, W : Winners

Vietnamese Clubs Statistics

Hòa Phát Hà Nội

Hà Nội ACB

Navibank Sài Gòn

Xuân Thành Sài Gòn

Vissai Ninh Bình

Than Quảng Ninh

FLC Thanh Hóa

SHB Đà Nẵng

Becamex Bình Dương

Sông Lam Nghệ An

Hà Nội

Hồ Chí Minh City

Sài Gòn

Viettel

Overall Statistics

By Clubs
As of 10 August 2022

Player records

 Most goals in competitions: Nguyễn Văn Quyết, 19
 Most goals in a season: Huỳnh Kesley Alves ( 2009 ), Pape Omar Faye ( 2019 ), each 8
As of 10 August 2022

See also
 Vietnamese football clubs in the AFC Champions League

References

RSSSF – AFC Cup

1960 establishments in North Vietnam
Football in Vietnam
Vietnamese football clubs in international competitions
Sports organizations established in 1960
Football clubs in the AFC Cup